Elwood is the musical project/collaboration of singer-songwriter Prince Elwood Strickland III (born in North Carolina) and co-producer and songwriter Brian Boland. Strickland worked as a recording engineer at Soho's Greene Street Recording facility where he and Boland met, working with artists such as Tricky, Mos Def, De La Soul, and Adam Yauch. Elwood worked with producer Steve Lillywhite on their debut album The Parlance of Our Time, which was co-released on Palm Pictures and Lillywhite's label, Gobstopper.

Elwood's cover of Gordon Lightfoot's song "Sundown" peaked at No. 33 on the Billboard Modern Rock Tracks chart on July 8, 2000. and number 65 in Australia. 

Elwood's first album, The Parlance of Our Time, was released May 16, 2000 and contains the following tracks:

Discography

Albums

References

External links

Official Elwood Site

American singer-songwriters
American hip hop musicians
American musical duos
Hip hop duos
1970 births
Living people
21st-century American singers